In physics, lattice field theory is the study of lattice models of quantum field theory, that is, of field theory on a space or spacetime that has been discretised onto a lattice.

Details
Although most lattice field theories are not exactly solvable, they are of tremendous appeal because they can be studied by simulation on a computer, often using Markov chain Monte Carlo methods. One hopes that, by performing simulations on larger and larger lattices, while making the lattice spacing smaller and smaller, one will be able to recover the behavior of the continuum theory as the continuum limit is approached. 

Just as in all lattice models, numerical simulation gives access to field configurations that are not accessible to perturbation theory, such as solitons. Likewise, non-trivial vacuum states can be discovered and probed. 

The method is particularly appealing for the quantization of a gauge theory. Most quantization methods keep Poincaré invariance manifest but sacrifice manifest gauge symmetry by requiring  gauge fixing. Only after renormalization can gauge invariance be recovered. Lattice field theory differs from these in that it keeps manifest gauge invariance, but sacrifices manifest Poincaré invariance— recovering it only after renormalization. The articles on lattice gauge theory and lattice QCD explore these issues in greater detail.

Further reading
 Creutz, M., Quarks, gluons and lattices, Cambridge University Press, Cambridge, (1985).  (renewed version: (2023) )
 DeGrand, T., DeTar, C., Lattice Methods for Quantum Chromodynamics, World Scientific, Singapore, (2006). 
 Gattringer, C., Lang, C. B., Quantum Chromodynamics on the Lattice, Springer, (2010). 
 Knechtli, F., Günther, M., Peardon, M., Lattice Quantum Chromodynamics: Practical Essentials, Springer, (2016). 
 Lin, H., Meyer, H.B., Lattice QCD for Nuclear Physics, Springer, (2014). 
 Makeenko, Y., Methods of contemporary gauge theory, Cambridge University Press, Cambridge, (2002). .
 Montvay, I., Münster, G., Quantum Fields on a Lattice, Cambridge University Press, Cambridge, (1997). 
 Rothe, H., Lattice Gauge Theories, An Introduction, World Scientific, Singapore, (2005). 
 Smit, J., Introduction to Quantum Fields on a Lattice, Cambridge University Press, Cambridge, (2002).

External links
 FermiQCD – A standard library of algorithms for lattice QCD